Chevitikallu is a village in Kanckikacherla mandal located in NTR district of the Indian state of Andhra Pradesh.

References 

Villages in NTR district